In algebraic geometry, an affine variety, or affine algebraic variety, over an algebraically closed field  is the zero-locus in the affine space  of some finite family of polynomials of  variables with coefficients in  that generate a prime ideal. If the condition of generating a prime ideal is removed, such a set is called an (affine) algebraic set. A Zariski open subvariety of an affine variety is called a quasi-affine variety.

Some texts do not require a prime ideal, and call irreducible an algebraic variety defined by a prime ideal. This article refers to zero-loci of not necessarily prime ideals as affine algebraic sets.

In some contexts, it is useful to distinguish the field  in which the coefficients are considered, from the  algebraically closed field  (containing ) over which the zero-locus is considered (that is, the points of the affine variety are in ). In the common case where  is the field of real numbers, a -rational point is called a real point. When the field  is not specified, a rational point is a point that is rational over the rational numbers. For example, Fermat's Last Theorem asserts that the affine algebraic variety (it is a curve) defined by  has no rational points for any integer  greater than two.

Introduction 

An affine (algebraic) variety is an affine algebraic set which is not the union of two proper affine algebraic subsets. Such an affine algebraic set is often said to be irreducible. 

The elements of the coordinate ring R are also called the regular functions or the polynomial functions on the variety. They form the ring of regular functions on the variety, or, simply, the ring of the variety; in other words (see #Structure sheaf), it is the space of global sections of the structure sheaf of X.

The dimension of a variety is an integer associated to every variety, and even to every algebraic set, whose importance relies on the large number of its equivalent definitions (see Dimension of an algebraic variety).

Examples 
The coordinate ring is thus the localization . 
 In particular,   (the affine line with the origin removed) is affine.
 On the other hand,  (the affine plane with the origin removed) is not an affine variety; cf. Hartogs' extension theorem.
 The subvarieties of codimension one in the affine space  are exactly the hypersurfaces, that is the varieties defined by a single polynomial.
 The normalization of an irreducible affine variety is affine; the coordinate ring of the normalization is the integral closure of the coordinate ring of the variety. (Similarly, the normalization of a projective variety is a projective variety.)

Rational points 

The collection of -rational points of an affine variety  is often denoted  Often, if the base field is the complex numbers , points which are -rational (where  is the real numbers) are called real points of the variety, and -rational points ( the rational numbers) are often simply called rational points.

This variety is called a circle, because the set of its -rational points is the unit circle. It has infinitely many -rational points that are the points 

where  is a rational number.

The circle  is an example of an algebraic curve of degree two that has no -rational point. This can be deduced from the fact that, modulo , the sum of two squares cannot be .

It can be proved that an algebraic curve of degree two with a -rational point has infinitely many other -rational points; each such point is the second intersection point of the curve and a line with a rational slope passing through the rational point.

The complex variety  has no -rational points, but has many complex points.

If  is an affine variety in  defined over the complex numbers , the -rational points of  can be drawn on a piece of paper or by graphing software. The figure on the right shows the -rational points of

Singular points and tangent space

If the point is singular, the affine subspace defined by these equations is also called a tangent space by some authors, while other authors say that there is no tangent space at a singular point.
A more intrinsic definition, which does not use coordinates is given by Zariski tangent space.

The Zariski topology 

The affine algebraic sets of kn form the closed sets of a topology on kn, called the Zariski topology.

The Zariski topology can also be described by way of basic open sets, where Zariski-open sets are countable unions of sets of the form  for  These basic open sets are the complements in kn of the closed sets  zero loci of a single polynomial. If k is Noetherian (for instance, if k is a field or a principal ideal domain), then every ideal of k is finitely-generated, so every open set is a finite union of basic open sets.

If V is an affine subvariety of kn the Zariski topology on V is simply the subspace topology inherited from the Zariski topology on kn.

Geometry–algebra correspondence 
The geometric structure of an affine variety is linked in a deep way to the algebraic structure of its coordinate ring.

Radical ideals (ideals which are their own radical) of k[V] correspond to algebraic subsets of V. Indeed, for radical ideals I and J,  if and only if  Hence V(I)=V(J) if and only if I=J. Furthermore, the function taking an affine algebraic set W and returning I(W), the set of all functions which also vanish on all points of W, is the inverse of the function assigning an algebraic set to a radical ideal, by the nullstellensatz. Hence the correspondence between affine algebraic sets and radical ideals is a bijection. The coordinate ring of an affine algebraic set is reduced (nilpotent-free), as an ideal I in a ring R is radical if and only if the quotient ring R/I is reduced.

Prime ideals of the coordinate ring correspond to affine subvarieties. An affine algebraic set V(I) can be written as the union of two other algebraic sets if and only if I=JK for proper ideals J and K not equal to I (in which case ). This is the case if and only if I is not prime. Affine subvarieties are precisely those whose coordinate ring is an integral domain. This is because an ideal is prime if and only if the quotient of the ring by the ideal is an integral domain.

Maximal ideals of k[V] correspond to points of V. If I and J are radical ideals, then  if and only if  As maximal ideals are radical, maximal ideals correspond to minimal algebraic sets (those which contain no proper algebraic subsets), which are points in V. If V is an affine variety with coordinate ring  this correspondence becomes explicit through the map  where  denotes the image in the quotient algebra R of the polynomial  An algebraic subset is a point if and only if the coordinate ring of the subset is a field, as the quotient of a ring by a maximal ideal is a field.

The following table summarises this correspondence, for algebraic subsets of an affine variety and ideals of the corresponding coordinate ring:

Products of affine varieties
A product of affine varieties can be defined using the isomorphism  then embedding the product in this new affine space. Let  and  have coordinate rings  and  respectively, so that their product  has coordinate ring .

Morphisms of affine varieties 

There is a one-to-one correspondence between morphisms of affine varieties over an algebraically closed field  and homomorphisms of coordinate rings of affine varieties over  going in the opposite direction.

More precisely, for each morphism  of affine varieties, there is a homomorphism  between the coordinate rings (going in the opposite direction), and for each such homomorphism, there is a morphism of the varieties associated to the coordinate rings. This can be shown explicitly: let  and  be affine varieties with coordinate rings  and  respectively. Let  be a morphism. Indeed, a homomorphism between polynomial rings  factors uniquely through the ring  and a homomorphism  is determined uniquely by the images of  Hence, each homomorphism  corresponds uniquely to a choice of image for each .

Similarly, for each homomorphism of the coordinate rings, a morphism of the affine varieties can be constructed in the opposite direction. This corresponds to the morphism of varieties  defined by

Structure sheaf 
Equipped with the structure sheaf described below, an affine variety is a locally ringed space.

Given an affine variety X with coordinate ring A, the sheaf of k-algebras  is defined by letting  be the ring of regular functions on U.

Let D(f) = { x | f(x) ≠ 0 } for each f in A. They form a base for the topology of X and so  is determined by its values on the open sets D(f). (See also: sheaf of modules#Sheaf associated to a module.)

The key fact, which relies on Hilbert nullstellensatz in the essential way, is the following:

Proof: The inclusion ⊃ is clear. If x is in D(f), then, since g is regular near x, there is some open affine neighborhood D(h) of x such that ; that is, hm g is in A and thus x is not in V(J). In other words,  and thus the Hilbert nullstellensatz implies f is in the radical of J; i.e., . 

The claim, first of all, implies that X is a "locally ringed" space since

where . Secondly, the claim implies that  is a sheaf; indeed, it says if a function is regular (pointwise) on D(f), then it must be in the coordinate ring of D(f); that is, "regular-ness" can be patched together.

Hence,  is a locally ringed space.

Serre's theorem on affineness 

A theorem of Serre gives a cohomological characterization of an affine variety; it says an algebraic variety is affine if and only if  for any  and any quasi-coherent sheaf F on X. (cf. Cartan's theorem B.) This makes the cohomological study of an affine variety non-existent, in a sharp contrast to the projective case in which cohomology groups of line bundles are of central interest.

Affine algebraic groups

An affine variety  over an algebraically closed field  is called an affine algebraic group if it has:
 An identity element  such that  for every  in 
 An inverse morphism, a regular bijection  such that  for every  in 

Together, these define a group structure on the variety.

For this reason, affine algebraic groups are often called linear algebraic groups. 

Affine algebraic groups play an important role in the classification of finite simple groups, as the groups of Lie type are all sets of -rational points of an affine algebraic group, where  is a finite field.

Generalizations 
 If an author requires the base field of an affine variety to be algebraically closed (as this article does), then irreducible affine algebraic sets over non-algebraically closed fields are a generalization of affine varieties. This generalization notably includes affine varieties over the real numbers.

 An affine variety plays a role of a local chart for algebraic varieties; that is to say, general algebraic varieties such as projective varieties are obtained by gluing affine varieties. Linear structures that are attached to varieties are also (trivially) affine varieties; e.g., tangent spaces, fibers of algebraic vector bundles.

 An affine variety is a special case of an affine scheme, a locally-ringed space which is isomorphic to the spectrum of a commutative ring (up to an equivalence of categories). This creates a more well-defined notion of the "generic point" of an affine variety, by assigning to each closed subvariety an open point which is dense in the subvariety. More generally, an affine scheme is an affine variety if it is reduced, irreducible, and of finite type over an algebraically closed field

Notes

See also 
Algebraic variety
Affine scheme
Representations on coordinate rings

References 
The original article was written as a partial human translation of the corresponding French article.

 
 Milne, Lectures on Étale cohomology

Algebraic geometry